Bobby Hart (born August 21, 1994) is an American football offensive tackle who is a free agent. He was drafted by the New York Giants in the seventh round of the 2015 NFL Draft. He played college football at Florida State. After three seasons, Hart was released by New York and signed with the Cincinnati Bengals, becoming a starter for three years and earning a contract extension before his release following the 2020 season. Hart has also been on the roster of the Miami Dolphins and Tennessee Titans.

High school career 
A native of Lauderhill, Florida, Hart attended St. Thomas Aquinas High School in Fort Lauderdale, where he was teammates with Giovani Bernard, Rashad Greene, Lamarcus Joyner, Cody Riggs, Marcus Roberson, and James White.

College career 
Hart started every game in his junior and senior years. As a senior at Florida State, Hart was named to the third-team All-ACC.

Professional career

New York Giants
Hart was drafted by the New York Giants in the seventh round, 226th overall, in the 2015 NFL Draft. When the Giants drafted Hart, they projected him as a guard in the NFL. To prepare for the switch, he worked out with former Pro Bowl center LeCharles Bentley. Hart, though, stayed primarily at right tackle in 2015.

In 2016, Hart started 13 games at right tackle.

Hart entered the 2017 season as the Giants’ second right tackle. He played in 10 games with 7 starts in 2017. He was waived/injured by the Giants on December 30, 2017 with an ankle injury and was placed on injured reserve after refusing to play in the team's season finale. On February 9, 2018, Hart was released by the Giants.

Cincinnati Bengals
On February 14, 2018, Hart signed with the Cincinnati Bengals. He started every game at right tackle in 2018. On March 11, 2019, Hart signed a three-year, $16.15 million contract extension with the Bengals.

Hart started all 16 games in 2019. In 2020, he played in 14 games, starting 13, and was ranked 35th of 52 offensive tackles by Pro Football Focus.

On March 19, 2021, Hart was released by the Bengals.

Buffalo Bills
On March 30, 2021, Hart signed a one-year contract with the Buffalo Bills. On August 31, 2021, Hart was released from the Bills during final roster cuts.

Miami Dolphins
On September 7, 2021, Hart was signed to the Miami Dolphins practice squad. He was released from the practice squad on September 20.

Buffalo Bills (second stint)
Hart was re-signed to the Buffalo Bills' practice squad on September 22, 2021.

Tennessee Titans
On October 20, 2021, Hart was signed by the Tennessee Titans off the Bills practice squad, following injuries to linemen Taylor Lewan and Ty Sambrailo. He played three games, starting one, before he was released on November 15 and re-signed to the practice squad.

Buffalo Bills (third stint)
On November 19, 2021, Hart was signed by the Buffalo Bills off the Titans practice squad after injuries to linemen Jon Feliciano and Spencer Brown. Hart spent time back on the Bills practice squad after being waived again on December 7 and was briefly placed on the reserve/COVID-19 list before being activated again in week 16. He was promoted to the active roster on December 27.

On April 11, 2022, Hart signed a one-year contract with the Bills. On September 20, 2022, Hart was suspended one game for throwing a punch after a game against the Tennessee Titans ended. Throughout the 2022 season, Hart saw more playing time as an extra run blocker on certain plays.

Controversies
Hart earned the ire of Bengals fans for several controversial posts on Instagram and Twitter during the 2020 offseason. Some of the posts covered topics such as COVID-19, support for DeSean Jackson after he received backlash for some posts seen as antisemitic, and an image that read "STOP PROMOTING HOMOSEXUALITY TO OUR CHILDREN!", which was later deleted. Hart later explained his posts, claiming that "I don't mean to offend nobody. I don't discriminate against anybody. I know that everyone thinks differently and I know that I have a platform that sometimes people can see things and take it a certain way and I'm definitely aware of that. As you mature and grow, I talked to the players, coaches and things like that."

References

External links 
 Florida State Seminoles bio
 New York Giants bio

1994 births
Living people
American football offensive guards
American football offensive tackles
Buffalo Bills players
Cincinnati Bengals players
Florida State Seminoles football players
Miami Dolphins players
New York Giants players
People from Lauderhill, Florida
Players of American football from Florida
Sportspeople from Broward County, Florida
Tennessee Titans players